Warren Ortman Ault (January 8, 1887 – May 14, 1989)  was an American historian, who taught at Boston University from 1913 to 1957.

Life
Ault graduated from Baker University in 1907, before studying at Jesus College, Oxford as a Rhodes Scholar. While a student at Baker, he was a member of the local Zeta Chi fraternity.  He then obtained a doctorate from Yale University in 1919, having served as a second lieutenant in the artillery in the First World War. He taught history at Boston University from 1913 to 1957, becoming William Edwards Huntington professor.  He became an Honorary Fellow of Jesus College, Oxford in 1971. He was elected a Fellow of the American Academy of Arts and Sciences in 1941.

References

1887 births
1989 deaths
American centenarians
20th-century American historians
American male non-fiction writers
American Rhodes Scholars
Alumni of Jesus College, Oxford
Baker University alumni
Boston University faculty
Fellows of the American Academy of Arts and Sciences
Yale University alumni
Men centenarians
People from Lenexa, Kansas
20th-century American male writers